Surendra Dubey is an Indian poet and writer of comic poems. An ayurvedic physician by profession, Dubey was born on 8 January 1953 at Bemetra, Durg, in the Indian state of Chhattisgarh. He has authored five books and has appeared on several stage and television shows. In 2010, the Government of India awarded him with the Padma Shri, India's fourth highest civilian award. He is also a recipient of Hasya Ratna Award from Kaka Hathsri in 2008.

References

Further reading

External links
 

1953 births
20th-century Indian poets
Living people
People from Bemetara district
Poets from Chhattisgarh
Recipients of the Padma Shri in literature & education